is a professional footballer who plays as a full back for Vissel Kobe. Born in the United States but raised in Japan, where he represented internationally.

Club career

Early career
Sakai was born in New York to a German mother and a Japanese father. The family moved to Japan when he was two years old. He grew up in Sanjō, Niigata prefecture. Sakai started playing football at Sanjō junior soccer club, together with his brother Noriyoshi. At age 15, he joined Albirex Niigata youth academy and entered Kaishi Gakuen High School. His team played at the Prince Takamado Cup, All Japan Club Youth Soccer tournament and J. League Youth tournament.

Years later in his final year at school, he was chosen as one of the designated players for development by J. League Division 1 and JFA. With this status, he was able to register as a J. League club player while he was still eligible to play for his school. He made his Albirex first-team debut, at the age of 17, on 15 November 2008 in the Emperor's Cup match against FC Tokyo. He officially signed with Albirex Niigata in the following season. After becoming professional, he was assigned the number 24 shirt. He made his professional football debut in the opening J1 League match of the 2009 season also against FC Tokyo.

VfB Stuttgart
On 1 January 2012, Gōtoku Sakai was loaned out to VfB Stuttgart until June 2013. VfB Stuttgart secured the contract option to sign Sakai permanently.

On 11 February 2012, Sakai made his Bundesliga debut for VfB Stuttgart in a 5–0 home victory against Hertha BSC. He made 14 starts and recorded five assists in his first Bundesliga season. Sakai scored his first goal for Stuttgart on 22 November 2012 in a 5–1 away victory against FC Steaua București in the 2012–13 UEFA Europa League group stage.

On 10 January 2013, Sakai signed a contract with Stuttgart until June 2016 and moved permanently to VfB.

Hamburger SV 
In the 2015-16 season, Sakai joined Hamburger SV.

Vissel Kobe 
On 14 August 2019, Sakai moved back to Japan to join Vissel Kobe.

International career
Sakai played for Japan U20 at the 2010 AFC U-19 Championship in China. In 2011, he was named in Japan's final 23-man squad to compete at the 2011 AFC Asian Cup in Qatar but had to withdraw due to an injury.

On 21 September 2011, Sakai was in the starting line-up of the Japan under-22 team in the first group match of his team in the 2012 Summer Olympics Asian Qualifiers against Malaysia. In the following group match against Bahrain he came off the bench. He participated with the Japan under-23 team in the 2012 Toulon Tournament. On 2 July 2012, Sakai was called up for the 2012 Summer Olympics Football tournament in London.

He made his debut for the Japan senior national team on 6 September 2012 in the Kirin Cup against the United Arab Emirates.

Sakai underlined his outstanding potential in late 2012 when he was selected by influential football website IBWM in their list of the 100 most exciting players in world football for 2013.

In May 2018 he was named in Japan's squad for the 2018 FIFA World Cup in Russia. After Japan lost in the Round of 16 to Belgium, Sakai announced his retirement from international duty.

Career statistics

Club

International

Honours
VfB Stuttgart
DFB-Pokal runner-up: 2012–13

Vissel Kobe
Emperor's Cup: 2019
Japanese Super Cup: 2020

Notes

References

External links

1991 births
Living people
Soccer players from New York City
Association football people from Niigata Prefecture
Japanese footballers
Association football fullbacks
Japan youth international footballers
Japan international footballers
2018 FIFA World Cup players
Japanese people of German descent
Japanese people of American descent
American emigrants to Japan
American soccer players
American people of Japanese descent
American sportspeople of Japanese descent
American people of German descent
J1 League players
Bundesliga players
2. Bundesliga players
Albirex Niigata players
VfB Stuttgart players
Hamburger SV players
Vissel Kobe players
Olympic footballers of Japan
Footballers at the 2012 Summer Olympics
2013 FIFA Confederations Cup players
2014 FIFA World Cup players
2015 AFC Asian Cup players
Japanese expatriate footballers
Expatriate footballers in Germany
Japanese expatriate sportspeople in Germany
Citizens of Japan through descent